Karim Abubakar (born 30 June 1995) is a Ghanaian footballer who plays as a striker for Sumgayit.

Club career

Early years in Ghana
Abubakar began his career with a Ghanaian junior-level club, Proud United. In 2008–09, he was the club's top scorer. In 2009–10, Abubakar moved to Division One League side Gamba All Blacks.

He transferred to Medeama S.C.'s reserve team in 2010–11. He was the top scorer of the season, and the team went on to become champions of the Southern Zone. Abubakar earned a first team spot after a successful season with the reserve side and played a further two seasons, scoring two goals in the 2011–12 campaign.

Abubakar was loaned in the January transfer window of the 2012–13 season to Okwawu United, another first division team, which reached the promotion playoffs.

Career in Spain
In 2013–14, Abubakar signed a three-year contract with Spanish side CD Leganés, where he played four months with the under-19 team. Later that season, he was loaned to AD Alcorcón B in the Tercera División. He was the top scorer and player of the year for the side, despite arriving mid-season. In 2014–15, he returned to the Leganés first team and made a preseason appearance. He was later loaned to UB Conquense in the Segunda División B. His contract was terminated due to unsettled salaries. Abubakar then joined CD Don Benito in the Tercera División.

In 2016–17, he moved to CD Valdivia, also in the third division. In 2017–18, he moved to UP Plasencia, also in the third division.

On 24 January 2023, Sumgayit announced the signing of Abubakar from Bnei Yehuda on a contract until the summer of 2023, with an option for an additional year.

References

External links
 
 

1995 births
Living people
Ghanaian footballers
Footballers from Accra
Association football forwards
All Blacks F.C. players
Medeama SC players
Okwawu United players
CD Leganés players
AD Alcorcón B players
UB Conquense footballers
Algeciras CF footballers
Yeclano Deportivo players
Hapoel Acre F.C. players
Bnei Yehuda Tel Aviv F.C. players
Sumgayit FK players
Ghana Premier League players
Segunda División B players
Tercera División players
Liga Leumit players
Azerbaijan Premier League players
Ghanaian expatriate footballers
Expatriate footballers in Spain
Expatriate footballers in Israel
Expatriate footballers in Azerbaijan
Ghanaian expatriate sportspeople in Spain
Ghanaian expatriate sportspeople in Israel
Ghanaian expatriate sportspeople in Azerbaijan